The Krieglach forced labour camp was a prisoner of war camp in Krieglach, Austria. It was built in 1939/40 and was built to house workers for the armaments factory "Reichswerke AG Hermann Göring" in wooden barracks. The plant operated until May 1945 and the German executives of the plant fled Krieglach to the west on May 7/8 1945, trying to cover their tracks in the last days of the Second World War by destroying all archives of the plant. The camp was liberated by allied troops on May 8 1945. Today no traces of the camp's existence can be found in the area.

A militarily organized security force was responsible for guarding the plant and the surrounding area. The camp had very strict rules of conduct with corporal punishment and temporary incarceration in a labor education camp being used as punishment in the event of rule violations. Prisoner documents were issued for the prisoners' stay at the Krieglach area.

The camp inmates were fed from a central kitchen, with the main foodstuffs being potatoes and beets.

Prisoners 
The camp housed Belgian and French prisoners of war from 1940, Soviets from 1941, Italians from 1943 and Greeks from 1944. The main areas of work for prisoners were the factory halls, the factory railroad, auxiliary work in the drop forge operation and the construction of the air protection tunnels.

Greek Prisoners 
Many Greeks were from the Peloponnese and were captured in June 1944, 4 months before German retreat from Greece in October 1944, in a large scale operation to imprison teenage and adult men for use in labour camps, while also influencing their families not to take part in the Greek Resistance. An example route via which prisoners were transported to the camp is Paralio Astros - Nafplion - Corinth - Haidari - Bulgaria - Serbia - Hungary - Vienna - Graz - Krieglach. 

118 Peloponnesian prisoners' names have been recorded with some of them dying while imprisoned at the camp. There are surviving written journals documenting the prisoners' experiences from their transport to and imprisonment at the camp, as well as their return from Krieglach after the German defeat.

Forced labourers under German rule during World War II
Nazi concentration camps in Austria
Bruck-Mürzzuschlag District